Washington is a city in Ozan Township, Hempstead County, Arkansas, United States. The population was 180 at the 2010 census, up from 148 in 2000. It is part of the Hope Micropolitan Statistical Area. The city is home to Historic Washington State Park.

History
From its establishment in 1824, Washington was an important stop on the rugged Southwest Trail for pioneers traveling to Texas. That same year it was established as the "seat of justice" for that area, and in 1825 the Hempstead County Court of Common Pleas was established, located in a building constructed next door to a tavern owned by early resident Elijah Stuart. Between 1832 and 1839 thousands of Choctaw American Indians passed through Washington on their way to Indian Territory. Frontiersmen and national heroes James Bowie, Sam Houston and Davy Crockett all traveled through Washington en route to the Alamo. Houston is believed to have planned parts of the revolt strategy in a tavern in Washington during 1834. James Black, a Washington blacksmith, is credited with creating a knife which became known as the iconic Bowie knife, carried by James Bowie.

During the War with Mexico, beginning in 1846, Washington became a rally point for volunteer troops on their way to serve with the US Army. Later, the town became a major service center for area planters, merchants and professionals. Following the capture of Little Rock by the Union Army in 1863, the pro-Confederate States of America state government moved the state government offices to Hot Springs for a short time, then ultimately based the state government out of Washington, making it the (rebel) state capital until 1865. Albert G. Simms (1882–1964), a United States representative from New Mexico, was born here. Following the construction of the Cairo and Fulton railroad eight miles to the south of Washington, which connected much of the state with Little Rock, the town began a slow decline. Now located on the area's primary travel route, Hope took on Washington's formerly important role.

Geography
U.S. Route 278 passes through Washington as Columbus Street, leading southeast to Hope and northwest  to Nashville. Arkansas Highway 195 has its northern terminus in Washington and leads southwest  to Fulton on the Red River.

The climate in this area is characterized by hot, humid summers and generally mild to cool winters. According to the Köppen Climate Classification system, Washington has a humid subtropical climate, abbreviated "Cfa" on climate maps.

Demographics

As of the census of 2000, there were 148 people, 78 households, and 40 families residing in the city. The racial makeup of the city was 38.51% White and 61.49% Black or African American.

There were 78 households, out of which 14.1% had children under the age of 18 living with them, 37.2% were married couples living together, 12.8% had a female householder with no husband present, and 48.7% were non-families. 44.9% of all households were made up of individuals, and 21.8% had someone living alone who was 65 years of age or older. The average household size was 1.90 and the average family size was 2.58.

In the city, the population was spread out, with 14.9% under the age of 18, 6.1% from 18 to 24, 25.0% from 25 to 44, 28.4% from 45 to 64, and 25.7% who were 65 years of age or older. The median age was 49 years. For every 100 females, there were 72.1 males. For every 100 females age 18 and over, there were 85.3 males.

The median income for a household in the city was $19,375, and the median income for a family was $21,042. Males had a median income of $41,875 versus $20,313 for females. The per capita income for the city was $16,066. There were 10.8% of families and 18.6% of the population living below the poverty line, including 25.0% of under eighteens and 21.7% of those over 64.

Education
Washington is within the Hope School District. Students attend Hope High School. The former Washington School District was dissolved on July 1, 1990, with its territory given to the Hope school district as well as the Blevins and Saratoga school districts.

Culture
Washington is home to Historic Washington State Park.

Notable people
James Black (1800–1872), blacksmith who crafted the Bowie knife based upon a design by Jim Bowie
Augustus Hill Garland (1832–1899), 38th Attorney General of the United States
Daniel Webster Jones (1839–1918), 19th Governor of Arkansas
Charles Burton Mitchel (1815–1864), C.S. Senator from Arkansas
Albert Gallatin Simms (1882–1964), Member of the U.S. House of Representatives from New Mexico's At-large district

See also

 List of cities and towns in Arkansas
 List of memorials to George Washington
 National Register of Historic Places listings in Hempstead County, Arkansas

References

External links 

 Washington (Hempstead County) at Encyclopedia of Arkansas

1824 establishments in Arkansas Territory
Cities in Arkansas
Cities in Hempstead County, Arkansas
Former state capitals in the United States
Former county seats in Arkansas
Hope micropolitan area
Planned cities in the United States
Populated places established in 1824